Scooba is a town in Kemper County, Mississippi, United States. The population was 732 as of the 2010 Census.

History 
The first permanent settlement at Scooba was made in the 1830s. Scooba is a Choctaw word meaning "reed brake" (i.e., a farming tool used on reeds), and the early settlement was noted for its productive farmland.

A line of the Gulf, Mobile and Ohio Railroad passed through Scooba.  A Democratic weekly newspaper, The Kemper Herald, was established in Scooba in 1876.  By the early 1900s, Scooba had several residential homes, a hotel, a livery barn, a post office, two saw milling plants, a cotton gin, a general store, five churches (three white and two colored), a school, and a bank (the Bank of Kemper, established in 1904).  Scooba was a local market for cotton.

In late December 1906, Scooba and Wahalak, Mississippi, were the sites of white rioting against blacks. In the various conflicts, which started with confrontations between passengers and conductors on the railroad, a total of 12 blacks and two whites were killed by December 26. The county sheriff called in the state militia for assistance. The events were covered by national newspapers.

Geography 

Scooba is adjacent to U.S. Route 45, Mississippi Highway 16, and a railroad.

Demographics

2020 census

As of the 2020 United States Census, there were 744 people, 191 households, and 107 families residing in the town.

2000 census
As of the census of 2000, there were 632 people, 204 households, and 139 families residing in the town. The population density was 257.3 people per square mile (99.2/km). There were 244 housing units at an average density of 99.3 per square mile (38.3/km). The racial makeup of the town was 54.91% African American, 44.30% White, 0.16% from other races, and 0.63% from two or more races. Hispanic or Latino of any race were 0.79% of the population.

There were 204 households, out of which 38.2% had children under the age of 18 living with them, 38.7% were married couples living together, 27.9% had a female householder with no husband present, and 31.4% were non-families. 30.4% of all households were made up of individuals, and 10.8% had someone living alone who was 65 years of age or older. The average household size was 2.47 and the average family size was 3.09.

In the town, the population was spread out, with 23.6% under the age of 18, 29.7% from 18 to 24, 19.5% from 25 to 44, 17.4% from 45 to 64, and 9.8% who were 65 years of age or older. The median age was 22 years. For every 100 females, there were 127.3 males. For every 100 females age 18 and over, there were 134.5 males.

The median income for a household in the town was $18,875, and the median income for a family was $31,375. Males had a median income of $30,500 versus $29,063 for females. The per capita income for the town was $12,110. About 30.3% of families and 25.5% of the population were below the poverty line, including 27.2% of those under age 18 and 15.0% of those age 65 or over.

Education 
The Town of Scooba is served by the Kemper County School District.

The main campus of East Mississippi Community College, including the college system's administrative headquarters, is in Scooba. EMCC was featured on the Netflix documentary Last Chance U, which chronicled their 2015 and 2016 football seasons.

Notable people 
 Abner M. Aust - United States Air Force officer and World War II flying ace.
 Kevin Granger - professional basketball player.
 Charles Jones - played four seasons in the National Basketball Association.
 John J. Pettus - 23rd Governor of Mississippi; moved to Scooba at age 22.

References

External links 

Meridian micropolitan area
Towns in Kemper County, Mississippi
Towns in Mississippi